Demetri Simms, better known by his stage name Meechy Darko, is an American rapper and songwriter from Brooklyn, New York. He is best known as a member of the hip hop trio Flatbush Zombies, with whom he began his rapping career with his longtime friends, Erick Arc Elliott and Zombie Juice in 2010. In 2022, he released his debut solo album Gothic Luxury.

Early life

Meechy Darko was born in Flatbush, New York, to a Jamaican family. He met his future bandmates Zombie Juice and Erick Arc Elliott at a very young age. Meech also was friends with the members of the rap group that would later be known as the Underachievers. They bonded while using LSD and Psilocybin mushrooms. During one of these experiences with shrooms, Meech felt that he had experienced ego death.

Music career

Meech, Juice, and Erick went on to form Flatbush Zombies in 2010. In January 2012, they released a music video for their song "Thug Waffle". The video received many views and caught attention of fans and other rappers. They released multiple other rap videos for their first mixtape "D.R.U.G.S", which was released in July 2012. The group then released their second mixtape "BetterOffDEAD" on September 11, 2013, at 9:11 PM. "BetterOffDEAD" went on to receive positive reviews from critics. In 2014, Meech announced that every Friday they would put out a new song for multiple weeks. In 2015, Meech announced that Flatbush Zombies were working on their debut album. In October 2015, they were invited to perform at Jay Z's Tidal concert. In January 2016, they were invited to "Yams Day", a concert that was dedicated to deceased ASAP Mob member A$AP Yams. In the same month, Flatbush Zombies released "Glorious Thugs" to SoundCloud, and also announced that their debut album "3001: A Laced Odyssey" was to be released on March 11, 2016. They also planned a tour to go along with the album. On March 11, the album was released, and sold 28,000 copies in its first week, debuting at #10 on the Billboard Album Sales Charts. Their latest album, "Vacation In Hell", was released on April 6, 2018, and they have continued to work independently under Glorious Dead Recordings. They also created an album in 2019 with hip hop collective Beast Coast called "Escape From New York".

On August 26, 2022, Meech released his debut solo album, "Gothic Luxury", on Loma Vista Recordings. The album contains features from Denzel Curry, Busta Rhymes, and Freddie Gibbs, amongst others.

Discography

Studio albums

Collaborative albums

EPs

Mixtapes

Singles

Guest appearances

References

American male rappers
American rappers of Jamaican descent
Living people
Rappers from Brooklyn
Songwriters from New York (state)
Alternative hip hop musicians
People from Flatbush, Brooklyn
21st-century American rappers
21st-century American male musicians
1989 births
American male songwriters
Beast Coast members